Streptomyces tunisialbus is a bacterium species from the genus of Streptomyces which has been isolated from rhizosphereic soil of a Lavandula officinalis plant.

See also 
 List of Streptomyces species

References 

tunisialbus
Bacteria described in 2020